Richard England may refer to:
Richard England (cyclist) (born 1981), Australian racing cyclist
Richard England (architect) (born 1937), Maltese architect, writer, artist and academic
Sir Richard England (British Army officer, born 1793) (1793–1883), British Army general
Richard G. England (1750–1812), British Army officer and Lieutenant-Governor of Plymouth

See also
King Richard (disambiguation)